There are at least 33 named lakes and reservoirs in Franklin County, Arkansas.

Lakes
According to the United States Geological Survey, there are no named lakes in Franklin County.

Reservoirs
	Lake Dardanelle, el.  
	Darby Lake, el.  
	Ozark Lake, el.  
	Charleston Lake, el.  
	Ozark City Lake, el.  
	Shores Lake, el.  
	Swiss Family Vineyards Reservoir, el.  
	Bruce Lake, el.  
	Sixmile Creek Site 17 Reservoir, el.  
	Sixmile Creek Site 16 Reservoir, el.  
	Sixmile Creek Site 18 Reservoir, el.  
	Sixmile Creek Site 26 Reservoir, el.  
	Sixmile Creek Site 25 Reservoir, el.  
	Sixmile Creek Site One Reservoir, el.  
	Sixmile Creek Site 21 Reservoir, el.  
	Sixmile Creek Site 22 Reservoir, el.  
	Sixmile Creek Site 23 Reservoir, el.  
	Sixmile Creek Site 24 Reservoir, el.  
	Sixmile Creek Site 13 Reservoir, el.  
	Sixmile Creek Site 14 Reservoir, el.  
	Lake Cecil, el.  
	Flanagan Lake, el.  
	Lake Number 20, el.  
	Lake Number 21, el.  
	Lake Number 22, el.  
	Lake Number One, el.  
	Lake Number Seventeen, el.  
	Lake Number Sixteen, el.  
	Lake Number Thirteen, el.  
	Lake Number Twentyfive, el.  
	Lake Number Twentyfour, el.  
	Lake Number Twentysix, el.  
	Lake Number Twentythree, el.

See also

 List of lakes in Arkansas

Notes

Bodies of water of Franklin County, Arkansas
Franklin